The point where the upper temporal line cuts the coronal suture is named the stephanion.

References

External links

 Item #22 (source here)

Skull